The Supercopa de España de Baloncesto 2013 was the 10th edition of the tournament. It is also called Supercopa Endesa for sponsorship reasons.

It was played in the Fernando Buesa Arena in Vitoria-Gasteiz.

Participant teams
Participant teams were known officially on 21 June 2013.

Semifinals

Final

References

External links
 Liga ACB website

Supercopa de España de Baloncesto
2013–14 in Spanish basketball cups